Orvieto ware is tin-glazed earthenware (maiolica) originally manufactured at Orvieto, Italy, where it has been produced since the 13th century.

Orvieto ware is mostly of green or manganese purple color (similar to their faience (Paterna ware) templates from Paterna, Spain), but also blue or yellow. It mixed Gothic and Middle East style elements, and often comes in the form of a jug with a large lip.

Italian pottery
Orvieto